The Hunters is a 1957 ethnographic film that documents the efforts of four !Kung men (also known as Ju/'hoansi or Bushmen) to hunt a giraffe in the Kalahari Desert of Namibia. The footage was shot by John Marshall during a Smithsonian-Harvard Peabody sponsored expedition in 1952–53. In addition to the giraffe hunt, the film shows other aspects of !Kung life at that time, including family relationships, socializing and storytelling, and the hard work of gathering plant foods and hunting for small game.

The film was produced at the Film Study Center of the Peabody Museum at Harvard University by John Marshall in collaboration with Robert Gardner. It won the Robert J. Flaherty Award for best one-off documentary from the British Academy of Film and Television Arts in 1958, and was named to the US National Film Registry by the Librarian of Congress in 2003 for its "cultural, aesthetic, or historical significance". The Hunters was preserved in 2000 with a grant from the National Film Preservation Foundation.

In his book At The Edge of History, William Irwin Thompson uses the structure of The Hunters to model the universal form of conflict in values in human institutions.

See also
 List of American films of 1957

References

External links
 
 The Hunters at Documentary Educational Resources
The Hunters essay by Daniel Eagan in America's Film Legacy: The Authoritative Guide to the Landmark Movies in the National Film Registry, A&C Black, 2010 , pages 541-542 

United States National Film Registry films
American documentary films
1957 films
BAFTA winners (films)
Anthropology documentary films
Films about hunter-gatherers
Films shot in Namibia
1950s English-language films
1950s American films